József Jakab (born 23 December 1954) is a Hungarian boxer. He competed in the men's bantamweight event at the 1976 Summer Olympics. At the 1976 Summer Olympics, he lost to Stephan Forster of East Germany.

References

External links
 

1954 births
Living people
Hungarian male boxers
Olympic boxers of Hungary
Boxers at the 1976 Summer Olympics
Sportspeople from Veszprém County
Bantamweight boxers
20th-century Hungarian people